Benjamin Luke Hall, OAM (born 20 March 1984)  is an Australian Paralympic athlete. He was born in Adelaide, South Australia.   He won a gold medal at the 2004 Athens Games in the Men's 4 × 100 m T35-38  event, for which he received a Medal of the Order of Australia.

References

Paralympic athletes of Australia
Athletes (track and field) at the 2004 Summer Paralympics
Paralympic gold medalists for Australia
Recipients of the Medal of the Order of Australia
Living people
Medalists at the 2004 Summer Paralympics
1984 births
Paralympic medalists in athletics (track and field)
Australian male sprinters